Harri "Rovis" Rovanperä (born 8 April 1966) is a Finnish rally driver who competed in the World Rally Championship from 1993 to 2006. He drove for SEAT (1997–00), Peugeot (2001–04), Mitsubishi (2005) and Red Bull Škoda Team (2006). Rovanperä was known as a loose surface specialist. He is the father of 2022 World Rally driver's championship winner Kalle Rovanperä.

Career
Rovanperä won the small Group A Finnish Rally Championship title in 1995 at the wheel of an Opel Astra. After a few outings on his national World Rally Championship event Rally Finland, he was hired by SEAT to drive the SEAT Ibiza Kit Car, with which he won SEAT's third consecutive 2L World Rally Championship title in 1998. Next year in 1999, he took part in the top class World Rally Championship with the SEAT Córdoba WRC E2 finishing in the third place in the last event of the season at the 55th Network Q Rally of Great Britain. In 2001, he was hired by Peugeot. Driving a Peugeot 206 WRC, he took his first WRC win at the Swedish Rally. The same year he finished fifth in the overall championship only eight points behind the winner, Richard Burns, despite missing two rallies.

On 9 December 2001 Rovanperä also competed at the Race of Champions at Gran Canaria, and by winning the individual event and taking home the Henri Toivonen Memorial Trophy, he earned the title of Champion of Champions, he beat in the final stage the German driver Armin Schwarz.

2002
The 2002 season began as usual with the Monte Carlo Rally, and Rovanperä competed in a privateer Bozian Racing run Peugeot 206 WRC. He retired on the 7th stage with broken steering after an off; Tommi Mäkinen won the race in front of a penalised Sébastien Loeb, while Carlos Sainz finished third.
The second rally was in Sweden, where Rovanperä returned in the official factory-entered Peugeot 206 WRC, and he finished the rally in second place, 1'24" behind team mate Marcus Grönholm, despite winning two stages and leading the rally from Stages 3 to 14.

The next two rallies were Tour de Corse and Rally de Cataluñya, both on tarmac, where Rovanperä competed for the Bozian-run team; on both rallies he failed to score, finishing 11th in Corsica and 7th in Spain, on a surface he traditionally struggled on.

The next rally took place on the island of Cyprus, where heavy rain made conditions treacherous. Rovanperä drove the official Peugeot works car; finishing 4th winning 1 stage. The rally was won again by his team mate Grönholm.

The WRC circus moved then to Argentina, where Peugeot had a dismal rally, Rovanperä retired after engine problems on S.S.10, Gronhölm and Burns took first and second, but were both disqualified a few days later due to an illegal flywheel and illegal servicing respectively; so Sainz won the rally from Petter Solberg.

In Greece, on a very hot and rough surface, Rovanperä finished 4th, winning 1 stage. The rally winner was Colin McRae.

The "World's toughest Rally", the Safari Rally, gifted Rovanperä with a second place, 2'50" behind the winner Colin McRae, in a rally that forced many of the drivers to retire.

In Finland Harri had what was possibly his strongest rally of the season, seizing the lead on the 12th stage, but on the next stage he crashed and a front suspension part was badly damaged, forcing him to retire. The rally was won by teammate Grönholm for the third year running.

In Germany (newcomer race in the WRC) Rovanperä drove an official car, as regular tarmac expert Gilles Panizzi was withdrawn from the event due to a shoulder injury sustained while carrying out DIY at his home. However, Rovanperä was forced to retire after a very difficult rally, which saw the first victory of Sébastien Loeb in a Citroën Xsara.

In Sanremo, Rovanperä returned to the Bozian team, but on asphalt the Finnish driver struggled and finished ninth, whilst Gilles Panizzi took a stunning win after the injury just three weeks before.

Rovanperä drove a near-faultless rally in New Zealand despite a hydraulic problem, finishing second, 3'50" behind Gronholm as he clinched his second world drivers championship.

The championship continued in the southern hemisphere with Rally Australia, and Rovanperä finished in second place again behind his team mate Grönholm, but this time only 57" behind, and winning 8 stages of the rally.

The season came to an end in the forests of Wales, where Rovanperä finished 7th after a race full of mistakes.

Rovanperä ended 2002 in 7th overall with 30 points, 47 behind teammate Gronholm, but only 7 behind runner-up Petter Solberg.

Next seasons

Rovanperä continued to drive for Peugeot on loose surface events during the 2003 and 2004 seasons, obtaining a further three podium places, one in 2003, and two in 2004. In 2005, Rovanperä moved to Mitsubishi and completed a full WRC programme, finishing seventh in the drivers' world championship, claiming one podium finish in Australia, where he was second behind François Duval. After Mitsubishi left the series at the end of 2005, Rovanperä signed on to drive for the semi-works Red Bull Škoda Team for six events during the 2006 season, his best result being 9th on the final event in Wales.

In 2007, Rovanperä was a regular competitor of the SRC Finnish Rallycross Championship with a rear-wheel driven Ford Focus as well as a Volvo S40, but finished only 11th overall. He had many technical problems with both cars.

In October 2010 Rovanperä and his co-driver Jouni Närhi got the first overall in La Carrera Panamericana in a Studebaker 1953 just 12.9 seconds ahead from the Mexican driver Michel Jourdain Jr.

WRC victories
{|class="wikitable"
!  # 
! Event
! Season
! Co-driver
! Car
|-
| 1
|  50th International Swedish Rally
| 2001
| Risto Pietiläinen
| Peugeot 206 WRC
|}

Career results

WRC results

References

External links

 

1966 births
Living people
World Rally Championship drivers
Finnish rally drivers
Finnish racing drivers
Sportspeople from Jyväskylä
Carrera Panamericana drivers
Peugeot Sport drivers
20th-century Finnish people
Cupra Racing drivers
Škoda Motorsport drivers